Unspeakable may refer to:

Film
The Unspeakable, a 1924 Polish silent film
Unspeakable (2000 film)
Unspeakable (2002 film), a horror film
Unspeakable (2006 film), a documentary by John Paskievich
Unspeakable: The Life & Art of Reverend Steven Johnson Leyba, a 2002 documentary film about Steven Johnson Leyba
Unspeakable, a 2017 television film starring Indira Varma

Literature 
Unspeakable (Harry Potter), a job in J. K. Rowling's fictional Harry Potter universe
Unspeakable: The Autobiography, a 2020 memoir by John Bercow
Unspeakable: The Tulsa Race Massacre, a picture book by Carole Boston Weatherford and Floyd Cooper

Music
Unspeakable (album), by Bill Frisell, 2004
"Unspeakable" (song), by Ace of Base, 2002
"Unspeakable", a song by Every Little Thing from Untitled 4 Ballads

Other uses
Unspeakable (TV series), a Canadian drama series